First Impressions of Earth is the third studio album by American rock band the Strokes. It was released through RCA Records first on December 30, 2005, in Germany, and January 3, 2006, elsewhere. Three singles were released from the album: "Juicebox", "Heart in a Cage", and "You Only Live Once".

Recording
The album was recorded over a ten-month period. The Strokes initially set out to record it with Gordon Raphael, the producer of their first two albums. Later on, guitarist Albert Hammond, Jr. introduced them to Grammy Award-winning producer David Kahne (Paul McCartney, Tony Bennett, Sublime), who stepped in to collaborate with Raphael. However, the collaboration was not working out and so Raphael stepped down. As a result, the majority of the album was produced by Kahne.

Reception

Critical

The album has a score of 69 out of 100 from Metacritic based on 38 reviews indicating "generally favorable reviews".  Some of the reviews were among the harshest the Strokes had received up to this point in the band's recording career. For instance, Heather Phares of AllMusic called the album the Strokes' "weakest album yet." At the same time, the album also received positive reviews from the likes of Will Hermes of Entertainment Weekly who praised the album and thought it was a marked improvement over the Strokes' previous album Room on Fire.  In his "Consumer Guide", Robert Christgau gave the album a three-star honorable mention while picking out two songs from the album ("You Only Live Once" and "Ask Me Anything") and stating, "You know how it is--the gym does more for your wind than for your jump shot."

Other reviews were positive. Playlouder gave it four-and-a-half stars out of five and said, "Turns out what the world was waiting for really was those that saved guitars finally making a record that truly reaped the rewards of their efforts." Punknews.org gave it a score of three-and-a-half stars out of five and said, "What exactly it is the Strokes ultimately hope to achieve with their music remains to be seen. However, so long as they continue to put out quality discs with high replay value, they will remain that rare breed of band where hype did not spoil the goods." MusicOMH gave it a score of three-and-a-half stars out of five and stated, "For the first six songs, the whole thing is as exhilarating as Is This It, it's in a different way, undoubtedly, but there's the same giddy rush of excitement." Stylus Magazine gave it a B− and called it "the first pretty good album of the year." Tiny Mix Tapes also gave the album a score of three-and-a-half stars out of five and said, "There is indeed more good than bad. Unfortunately, there is also more bad than there should be."

Some of the reviews are mixed or negative. Drowned in Sound gave it a score of six out of ten and stated, "Cast away the politics and the last twenty minutes and you'll still be left with two or three top tunes to add to your daily playlists, but it was never going to be ground-breaking or innovative." Uncut gave it three stars out of five and said, "The ambition's hampered by Julian Casablancas' sad-sack singing." Paste also gave it a score of six out of ten and stated, "By the time they're through brandishing quotations, The Strokes don't have much of their own to say here." Slant Magazine gave it two-and-a-half stars out of five and said it "introduces some subtle new colors to the band's musical palette... but the pervasive sense of inert boredom, which has been noted as a strength in the past, is difficult to shake." PopMatters gave it a score of five stars out of ten and said, "While it might be easy to point to the industry guy behind the boards, the album speaks for itself, and the Strokes managed to write a flop all by themselves."

"Heart in a Cage" was the album's second single, followed by "You Only Live Once". NME rated First Impressions of Earth at #8 in its Albums of the Year 2006 list.

Commercial
First Impressions of Earth entered the UK Albums Chart at number one, the Strokes' first album at the top spot. The album peaked at #4 in the US, with an entry sales week of 88,000 units, somewhat below the performance of its predecessors. In Canada, the album debuted at #3, selling just under 10,000 copies. As of October 2006, the album had sold 271,000 units in the US, and has received gold certification for sold over 500.000 units by RIAA in June 2021. Although the album was the band's first release to reach #1 on any chart worldwide, it is the only one not to reach UK platinum status, and spent much less time on the charts than the previous albums. However, it has still achieved gold sales in Australia. and UK.

Track listing

Personnel

The Strokes
Julian Casablancas – vocals, drums on "Evening Sun" 
Albert Hammond, Jr. – guitar
Nick Valensi – guitar, Mellotron on "Ask Me Anything"
Nikolai Fraiture – bass guitar
Fabrizio Moretti – drums, percussion

Production
Steve Sisco – assistant mixing engineer
Howie Weinberg – mastering
Bob Ludwig – mastering ("Killing Lies" and "Fear of Sleep")
Andy Wallace – mixing
David Kahne – producer, engineer
Gordon Raphael – producer ("Razorblade", "Electricityscape, and "Killing Lies")

Design
Piero Fornasetti – disc artwork ("Strumenti Musicali", 1952)
Lothar Quinte – cover art ("Ohne Titel", 1968)
Günter Fruhtrunk – rear cover art ("Mathematik der Intuition", 1962)
James Bellesini - album design for Love Police
Dan Winters – photography

Artwork
The following artworks appear in the 32-page booklet included with the deluxe version of the album:

"You Only Live Once"
picture of lathanum aluminate by Professor Michael Davidson

"Juicebox"
"Rocketship" (from cover of Fantastic Story Magazines Summer 1952 issue) by Alex Schomburg

"Heart in a Cage"
"The Brain" by Henry Groskinsky

"Razorblade"
"Scout" by Richard Phillips

"On the Other Side"
"Nativity", 13th CE by Guido da Siena
"The Flayed Ox", 1655 by Rembrandt Harmensz van Rijn
"Les Pantoufles, The Slippers" by Samuel van Hoogstraten
"The Pieta of Saint-Germain-des-Prés", ca. 1500 by The Master of Saint-Germain-des-Prés

"Vision of Division"
"The Continuous Monument", 1969 by Superstudio

"Ask Me Anything"
music notes and "Yellow Room" courtesy of Milton Glaser

"Electricityscape"
Image #BB1863 by John Foxx

"Killing Lies"
Etoffe & Tapis Etrangers. Plate 19. by Benigno Crespi

"Fear of Sleep"
West 83rd St., New York City, 1996 photo by Jeff Prant

"15 Minutes"
"Lowe's Paradise Theater" by Henry Groskinsky

"Ize of the World"Gun Barrel Eyes image by Milton Glaser"Red Light"'''
"Leopard", 1967 by Mel Ramos

Singles

Charts

Weekly charts

Year-end charts

Certifications

References

External links
 First Impressions of Earth at Last.fm

2005 albums
2006 albums
RCA Records albums
Rough Trade Records albums
Albums produced by David Kahne
Albums produced by Gordon Raphael
The Strokes albums